Asota avacta is a moth of the family Erebidae first described by Charles Swinhoe in 1892. It is found in Indonesia and Malaysia.

The wingspan is 54–57 mm.

References

Asota (moth)
Moths of Asia
Moths described in 1892